Jahna Lindemuth (born October 3, 1969) is an American attorney who served as the 31st Alaska Attorney General. Lindemuth was appointed by Alaska Governor Bill Walker on June 28, 2016, following the resignation of previous Attorney General Craig Richards.

Career
Prior to her appointment as Alaska Attorney General, Lindemuth was the managing partner of the Anchorage office of Dorsey & Whitney. In January, 2016, Lindemuth spoke to the media as a representative of Dorsey & Whitney, following the deliberate crash of an Alaska Civil Air Patrol plane into the firms downtown Anchorage offices. The crash was determined to be an act of suicide by the husband of a member of the firm.

Lindemuth was actively involved in the defense of the Fairbanks Four. She helped gain the men's freedom after they spent many years in prison for a murder conviction in which they were not guilty.

See also
List of female state attorneys general in the United States

References

1969 births
21st-century American politicians
Alaska Attorneys General
Alaska Independents
American women lawyers
Living people
Politicians from Anchorage, Alaska
UC Berkeley School of Law alumni
Women state constitutional officers of Alaska
21st-century American women politicians